Cycloramphus brasiliensis is a species of frog in the family Cycloramphidae.
It is endemic to Brazil.
Its natural habitats are subtropical or tropical moist lowland forest, subtropical or tropical moist montane forest, and rivers.
It is threatened by habitat loss.

References

brasiliensis
Endemic fauna of Brazil
Amphibians of Brazil
Taxonomy articles created by Polbot
Amphibians described in 1864